Depending on the context, the term non-sovereign nation, non-sovereign state or non-sovereign country, could mean:
 A previously independent state, representing those nations which were independent but were subsumed into transnational states like the United Kingdom or Germany. See List of former sovereign states
 An active autonomist or secessionist movement, representing those nations which are currently part of a transnational state but would like to secede from the state. See List of active autonomist and secessionist movements
A dependent territory, a territory which often has a high degree of self-governance, but which is governed by another "parent" state. It often has cultural and historical ties to, and relies on, the parent state for defence.

See related 

 Devolution